Don Ross may refer to:

 Don Ross, Australian artist, inaugural vice-president of the Contemporary Art Society, Queensland Branch in 1961
 Don Ross (acoustician) (1922–2015), civilian submariner and acoustics expert
 Don Ross (baseball) (1914–1996), American baseball player
 Don Ross (bodybuilder) (1946–1995), American bodybuilder and wrestler
 Don Ross (guitarist) (born 1960), Canadian fingerstyle guitarist
 Don Ross (album)
 Don Ross (footballer) (born 1934), Australian rules footballer
 Don Ross (ice hockey) (born 1942), American ice hockey player
 Don Ross (theatre producer) (1902–1980), English music hall performer and theatre producer

See also
 Donald Ross (disambiguation)